Tally of the Yes Men is the debut album by the indie rock band Goldspot, released in 2005.

Critical reception
PopMatters called the record "a solid album of slightly melancholic pop songs built around a solid core of vocal melodies and compelling instrumentation." The Los Angeles Times wrote that the album "washes down its classic pop songwriting with Cure Light (and other Britpop flavors), plus subtle Indian influences." LA Weekly wrote: "A triumph of quality over fashion, Goldspot are a collage of Radiohead’s acoustic yearnings, the Smiths’ smarty-pop, clean ’n’ cultured arrangements and main man Siddhartha’s eyelids-fluttering vibrato."

Track listing
All songs written by Siddhartha Khosla and Ramy Antoun.

 "Rewind" – 3:34
 "Cusp" – 2:55
 "Friday" – 4:17
 "The Guard" – 3:00
 "Time Bomb" – 4:12
 "It's Getting Old" – 4:09
 "The Feel Good Program of the Year" – 3:54
 "So Fast" - 3:23
 "The Assistant" - 4:06
 "Motorcade" - 4:55
 "In the Post" - 4:21

Personnel
Siddhartha Khosla

References 

2006 debut albums
Goldspot albums
Sub Pop albums